The 2009 Walsh Cup was a hurling competition played by the teams of Leinster GAA, a team from Connacht GAA and a team from Ulster GAA.  The competition differs from the Leinster Senior Hurling Championship as it also features further education colleges and the winning team does not progress to another tournament at All-Ireland level. The first four losers of the competition entered the Walsh Shield.

Walsh Cup

Quarter-finals
The quarter finals saw Kilkenny, Antrim, Galway and Wexford proceed to the next round, while Dublin, Laois, Wexford and Offaly were left to contest the Walsh Shield.

Semi-finals
The semi finals saw Kilkenny playing the previous year's winners, Antrim, while Galway faced Wexford. Both Kilkenny and Galway progressed to meet in the final.

Final

Walsh Shield
The Walsh Shield was created in 2008 and was contested for the second time in 2009.  It consisted of the losing quarter finalists of the Walsh Cup, with Dublin coming through to win for the first time.

References

Walsh Cup
Walsh Cup (hurling)